Christianity is a minority in Jilin, a province of China. St. Theresa's Cathedral and Changchun Christian Church exist in Changchun. Kim-Jong-il visited a Catholic church in the province in 2010. There were raids against many house churches of Jilin in 2005. At least 600 were arrested.
The province has hundreds of thousands of Protestants. The number of Protestants decidedly exceeds that of the Catholics. It has occurred, that churches in Yanbian Korean Autonomous Prefecture have been shut down. Jilin City has a Catholic church built after Gothic models.

List of Roman Catholic dioceses with seat in Jilin
Roman Catholic Diocese of Jilin
Roman Catholic Diocese of Sipingjie
Roman Catholic Diocese of Yanji

See also 
 Christianity in Jilin's neighbouring provinces
 Christianity in Heilongjiang
 Christianity in Inner Mongolia
 Christianity in Liaoning

References

Christianity in China by location